The Russia women's national football team represents Russia in international women's football. The team is controlled by the Russian Football Union and affiliated with UEFA. Yuri Krasnozhan replaced Elena Fomina as coach of the team in December 2020.

Russia qualified for two World Cups, 1999, 2003 and five European Championships, 1997, 2001, 2009, 2013 and 2017.

As the men's team, the Russian women's national team is the direct successor of the CIS and USSR women's national teams.

On 28 February 2022, due to the 2022 Russian invasion of Ukraine and in accordance with a recommendation by the International Olympic Committee (IOC), FIFA and UEFA suspended the participation of Russia, including in the UEFA Women's Euro 2022. Russian Football Union unsuccessfully appealed the FIFA and UEFA bans to the Court of Arbitration for Sport, which upheld the bans.

History

The beginning
The USSR (who became the Commonwealth of Independent States during the campaign) reached the 1993 UEFA European Women's Championship quarter-finals at their only attempt and Russia were to match that two years later, with both teams losing to Germany over two legs. In 1997, they qualified directly for the final tournament but once there were defeated by Sweden, France – who they had beaten in the preliminaries – and Spain. However, they were among six European sides to qualify for the 1999 FIFA Women's World Cup, thanks to two 2–1 play-off wins against Finland, and  victories over Japan and Canada earned them a quarter-final, where they lost to eventual runners-up China.

After the turn of the 21st century
They cruised unbeaten into the 2001 continental finals but managed only a point against England in the group stage. Russia's qualifying run then continued in the 2003 World Cup and they again reached the quarter-finals before a 7–1 loss to Germany. That preceded something of a decline in fortunes as Finland avenged their 1999 reverse by beating Russia in the play-offs for UEFA WOMEN'S EURO 2005, before Russia had the misfortune to draw Germany in 2007 World Cup qualifying.

Present
A young member of the 2003 squad, Elena Danilova, inspired victory in the 2005 UEFA European Women's Under-19 Championship, their first post-Soviet national team title at any level. Although the striker suffered injury problems, many of her colleagues graduated to the senior squad, with Russia eventually reaching the 2009 finals with an away-goals play-off success against Scotland. At the final tournament, Russia were drawn against Sweden, Italy and England in Group C. The team was unable to get past the group stage and finished last as they lost all the three matches, scoring 2 and conceding 8.

In the 2011 FIFA Women's World Cup Qualifiers, Russia were drawn in Group 6 with Switzerland, Republic of Ireland, Israel and Kazakhstan, where Russia was eliminated in the group stage as they ended the stage behind Switzerland.

On 13 April 2021, Russia defeated Portugal 1–0 to qualify for UEFA Women's Euro 2022. However, on 28 February 2022, due to the 2022 Russian invasion of Ukraine and in accordance with a recommendation by the International Olympic Committee (IOC), FIFA and UEFA suspended the participation of Russia, including in the UEFA Women's Euro 2022. The Russian Football Union unsuccessfully appealed the FIFA and UEFA bans to the Court of Arbitration for Sport, which upheld the bans.

Team image

Kits and crest
Russia's home kit consists of marron-red shirt, red shorts, and red-white socks. Their away kit consists of white jersey and light blue shorts and light-blue-white socks.

Home stadium
The Russia women's national football team plays their home matches on the Rossiyanka Stadium.

Results and fixtures
The following is a list of match results in the last 12 months, as well as any future matches that have been scheduled.

Legend

2022

Russia Results and Fixtures – SoccerWay.com

Coaching staff

Current coaching staff

Manager history

Players

Current squad
 The following players were called up for the matches against Belarus in October 2022.
 Caps and goals accurate up to and including 13 October 2022.

Recent call ups
 The following players have been called up in the past 12 months.

Previous squads

FIFA Women's World Cup
 1999 FIFA Women's World Cup
 2003 FIFA Women's World Cup

Records

Active players in bold, statistics correct as of 2020.

Most capped players

Top goalscorers

Competitive record

FIFA Women's World Cup

*Draws include knockout matches decided on penalty kicks.

UEFA Women's Championship

*Draws include knockout matches decided on penalty kicks.

Algarve Cup

 Albena Cup: won in 1999, 2001, 2004

See also

 Russia women's national football team results
 Russia women's international footballers
 Russia women's national under-19 football team
 Russia women's national under-17 football team
 Russia women's national under-15 football team
 Russia women's national futsal team
 Russia national football team

References

External links
Official website
FIFA profile

 
European women's national association football teams